Kirk Torrance is an actor and playwright from New Zealand, best known for his role as Wayne Judd in Outrageous Fortune. He is also a former Commonwealth Games swimmer.

Career
His debut play Strata (2003) won Best New Playwright at the Chapman Tripp Theatre Awards. He played the lead role of Holden in the New Zealand movie Stickmen (2001) and award-winning television drama Fish Skin Suit (2003). While appearing on Outrageous Fortune, he hosted one series of a New Zealand version of The Real Hustle.

He was nominated Best Supporting Actor at the Qantas Film & Television Awards 2008 for his ex-cop role in the television series Outrageous Fortune. In 2008, he was named Sexiest Man in Auckland by Metro magazine.

Torrance is a graduate from Toi Whakaari New Zealand Drama School in Wellington, having graduated with a Diploma in Acting in 1994, upgraded to a Bachelor of Performing Arts (Acting) in 2003.

He is Māori of Ngāti Kahungunu heritage.

Filmography

Film

Television

Video game

Web

References

External links

Living people
New Zealand Māori people
Ngāti Kahungunu people
New Zealand male film actors
21st-century New Zealand dramatists and playwrights
Year of birth missing (living people)
New Zealand male backstroke swimmers
Swimmers at the 1986 Commonwealth Games
Swimmers at the 1990 Commonwealth Games
Toi Whakaari alumni
New Zealand male Māori actors
New Zealand male soap opera actors
20th-century New Zealand male actors
21st-century New Zealand male actors
21st-century New Zealand male writers
New Zealand male dramatists and playwrights
Commonwealth Games competitors for New Zealand